William H. Young may refer to:

William H. Young (labor leader) (born 1946), American labor leader
William H. Young (died 1899), founder of Young's Scouts
William Henry Young (1863–1942), British mathematician
William Henry Young (politician) (1845–?), American politician
William Hugh Young (1838–1901), Confederate general

See also
William Young (disambiguation)